
Gmina Gomunice is a rural gmina (administrative district) in Radomsko County, Łódź Voivodeship, in central Poland.

Villages
Gmina Gomunice contains the villages and settlements of Borowiecko-Kolonia, Chruścin, Chrzanowice, Gertrudów, Gomunice, Hucisko, Karkoszki, Kletnia, Kletnia-Kolonia, Kocierzowy, Kolonia Chrzanowice, Kolonia Piaszczyce, Kosówka, Marianka, Paciorkowizna, Piaszczyce, Pirowy, Pudzików, Słostowice, Wąglin, Wielki Bór, Wojciechów, Wójcik-Fryszerka and Zygmuntów.

Neighbouring gminas
Gmina Gomunice is bordered by the gminas of Dobryszyce, Gorzkowice, Kamieńsk, Kodrąb and Radomsko.

References
Polish official population figures 2006

Gomunice
Radomsko County